Jinhui Shipping and Transport is a Hong Kong-based Bermuda-registered shipping company that operates 35 vessels. The company is owned for 54.77% by Jinhui Holdings and has been listed on the Oslo Stock Exchange since 1994.

Shipping companies of Hong Kong
Shipping companies of the Bahamas